Forest County is the name of two counties in the United States:

Forest County, Pennsylvania 
Forest County, Wisconsin

See also
Forrest County, Mississippi